"Scottish Christmas" was a one-off Christmas release from Les Disques Du Crepuscule/Factory Benelux. Its A-side is "Scottish Christmas" by Paul Haig and its B-sides, "Christmas for Pauline" and "Snowflakes" are by The Durutti Column.

"Scottish Christmas" and "Snowflakes" appeared on the Crepuscule compilation, Ghosts of Christmas Past.

Track listing 
 "Scottish Christmas" (Paul Haig)
 "Christmas for Pauline" (Durutti Column)
 "Snowflakes" (Durutti Column)

References

Paul Haig songs
British Christmas songs
Songs about Scotland
Songs written by Paul Haig
1985 songs